These are the full results of the athletics competition at the 2014 Central American and Caribbean Games which took place between November 23 and November 30, 2014 at Heriberto Jara Corona Stadium in Xalapa, Veracruz, Mexico.

Men's results

100 meters

Heat 1 – 24 November 10:30 – Wind: -1.0 m/s – Temperature: 24 °C – Humidity: 58%

Heat 2 – 24 November 10:37 – Wind: -0.7 m/s

Heat 3 – 24 November 10:44 – Wind: +0.4 m/s

Final – 25 November 15:05 – Wind: +0.9 – Temperature: 16 °C – Humidity: 85%

200 meters

Heat 1 – 26 November 11:25 – Wind: -0.8 m/s – Temperature: 14 °C – Humidity: 80%

Heat 2 – 26 November 11:32 – Wind: -0.8 m/s

Heat 3 – 26 November 11:39 – Wind: +1.9 m/s

Heat 4 – 26 November 11:46 – Wind: +0.6 m/s

Semifinal 1 – 26 November 13:35 – Wind: -0.4 m/s – Temperature: 16 °C – Humidity: 74%

Semifinal 2 – 26 November 13:42 – Wind: -0.2 m/s

Final – 27 November 13:50 – Wind: -1.8 – Temperature: 16 °C – Humidity: 62%

400 meters

Heat 1 – 25 November 13:40 – Temperature: 17 °C – Humidity: 89%

Heat 2 – 25 November 13:47

Heat 3 – 25 November 13:54

Final – 26 November 14:20 – Temperature: 16 °C – Humidity: 72%

800 meters

Heat 1 – 26 November 10:35 – Temperature: 13 °C – Humidity: 81%

Heat 2 – 26 November 10:42

Final – 28 November 11:20 – Temperature: 15 °C – Humidity: 72%

1500 meters
Final – 27 November 13:10 – Temperature: 16 °C – Humidity: 62%

5000 meters
Final – 24 November 13:30 – Temperature: 25 °C – Humidity: 63%

10,000 meters
Final – 27 November 11:45 – Temperature: 16 °C – Humidity: 62%

Marathon
Final – 30 November 11:45

110 meters hurdles

Heat 1 – 27 November 11:25 – Wind: -1.4 m/s – Temperature: 16 °C – Humidity: 62%

Heat 2 – 27 November 11:32 – Wind: -1.6 m/s

Final – 28 November 10:55 – Wind: +0.7 – Temperature: 15 °C – Humidity: 75%

400 meters hurdles

Heat 1 – 26 November 12:00 – Temperature: 14 °C – Humidity: 80%

Heat 2 – 26 November 12:07

Final – 27 November 14:15 – Temperature: 16 °C – Humidity: 62%

3000 meters steeplechase
Final – 28 November 13:05 – Temperature: 16 °C – Humidity: 77%

4 x 100 meters relay
Final – 28 November 12:40 – Temperature: 16 °C – Humidity: 77%

4 x 400 meters relay
Final – 28 November 14:00 – Temperature: 16 °C – Humidity: 77%

20 kilometers walk
Final – 23 November 13:05

50 kilometers walk
Final – 29 November 13:05

High jump
Final – 27 November 10:40 – Temperature: 15 °C – Humidity: 65%

Pole vault
Final – 28 November 10:40 – Temperature: 14 °C – Humidity: 76%

Long jump
Final – 26 November 13:30 – Temperature: 16 °C – Humidity: 74%

Triple jump
Final – 28 November 10:00 – Temperature: 14 °C – Humidity: 76%

Shot put
Final – 25 November 12:10 – Temperature: 17 °C – Humidity: 88%

Discus throw
Final – 24 November 11:45 – Temperature: 25 °C – Humidity: 58%

Hammer throw
Final – 26 November 11:45 – Temperature: 13 °C – Humidity: 77%

Javelin throw
Final – 28 November 12:25 – Temperature: 16 °C – Humidity: 72%

Decathlon
Final  – 24/25 November

Women's results

100 meters

Heat 1 – 24 November 10:00 – Wind: -0.4 m/s – Temperature: 24 °C – Humidity: 58%

Heat 2 – 24 November 10:07 – Wind: +0.1 m/s

Final – 25 November 14:40 – Wind: +1.5 – Temperature: 16 °C – Humidity: 85%

200 meters

Heat 1 – 26 November 13:15 – Wind: +0.1 m/s – Temperature: 16 °C – Humidity: 75%

Heat 2 – 26 November 13:22 – Wind: +1.0 m/s

Final – 27 November 13:30 – Wind: -1.6 – Temperature: 16 °C – Humidity: 62%

400 meters

Heat 1 – 25 November 13:10 – Temperature: 17 °C – Humidity: 89%

Heat 2 – 25 November 13:17

Final – 26 November 14:00 – Temperature: 16 °C – Humidity: 74%

800 meters
Final – 25 November 14:15 – Temperature: 16 °C – Humidity: 85%

1500 meters
Final – 27 November 12:55 – Temperature: 16 °C – Humidity: 62%

5000 meters
Final – 26 November 12:25 – Temperature: 16 °C – Humidity: 75%

10,000 meters
Final – 24 November 12:30 – Temperature: 25 °C – Humidity: 63%

Marathon
Final – 30 November 12:30

100 meters hurdles

Heat 1 – 25 November 12:40 – Wind: +0.7 m/s – Temperature: 17 °C – Humidity: 92%

Heat 2 – 25 November 12:47 – Wind: +0.3 m/s

Final – 26 November 12:55 – Wind: -0.8 – Temperature: 16 °C – Humidity: 75%

400 meters hurdles

Heat 1 – 24 November 11:15 – Temperature: 25 °C – Humidity: 58%

Heat 2 – 24 November 11:22

Final – 26 November 15:05 – Temperature: 16 °C – Humidity: 72%

3000 meters steeplechase
Final – 28 November 11:45 – Temperature: 15 °C – Humidity: 72%

4 x 100 meters relay
Final – 28 November 12:15 – Temperature: 16 °C – Humidity: 72%

4 x 400 meters relay
Final – 28 November 13:35 – Temperature: 16 °C – Humidity: 77%

20 kilometers walk
Final – 23 November 11:45

High jump
Final – 26 November 13:00 – Temperature: 16 °C – Humidity: 75%

Pole vault
Final – 24 November 13:30 – Temperature: 25 °C – Humidity: 63%

Long jump
Final – 25 November 12:00 – Temperature: 17 °C – Humidity: 88%

Triple jump
Final – 27 November 11:30 – Temperature: 16 °C – Humidity: 62%

Shot put
Final – 27 November 10:00 – Temperature: 13 °C – Humidity: 65%

Discus throw
Final – 26 November 11:30 – Temperature: 14 °C – Humidity: 80%

Hammer throw
Final – 24 November 11:30 – Temperature: 23 °C – Humidity: 54%

Javelin throw
Final – 27 November 12:25 – Temperature: 16 °C – Humidity: 62%

Heptathlon
Final  – 26/27 November

References

Central American and Caribbean Games
2014